"What Do You Know About Love" is a song written and recorded by American country music artist Dwight Yoakam.  It was released in September 2000 as the first single from the album Tomorrow's Sounds Today.  The song reached #26 on the Billboard Hot Country Singles & Tracks chart.

Chart performance

Notes

References

2000 singles
2000 songs
Dwight Yoakam songs
Songs written by Dwight Yoakam
Song recordings produced by Pete Anderson
Reprise Records singles